The following is a timeline of the history of the city of Bari in the Apulia region of Italy.

Prior to 15th century

 450 - Roman Catholic diocese of Bari established (approximate date).
 847 - Establishment of Emirate of Bari.
 852 - Emirate of Bari headquartered in city.
 871 - Fall of Bari to the forces of the Frankish Emperor Louis and his Lombard and Croatian allies.
 885 - Bari becomes "residence of the Byzantine governor."
 1002 - City besieged by "a Sicilian force under Safi."
 1035 - Cathedral of San Sabino construction begins.
 1068/71 - Siege of Bari  by Norman forces.
 1087 - Basilica di San Nicola construction begins (approximate date).
 1095 - Peter the Hermit preaches the First Crusade.
 1098 - Religious council held in Bari.
 1136 - City taken by forces of Lothair II, Holy Roman Emperor.
 1155 - Manuel I Komnenos in power.
 1156 - Bari sacked by forces of William I of Sicily.
 1171 - Cathedral of San Sabino construction completed.
 1197 - Basilica di San Nicola consecrated.
 1233 - Castello Normanno-Svevo (Bari) (castle) rebuilt.
 1292 - Cathedral of San Sabino consecrated.
 1349 - City besieged by Hungarian and German forces.
 1399 - Giovanni Bozzuto appointed captain.

15th–19th centuries
 1464 - Sforza in power.
 1500 - Isabella of Aragon, Duchess of Milan in power.
 1545 - Population: 12,800.
 1567 - Flood.
 1558 - Bona Sforza leaves the town to Philip II. of Spain and Naples.
 1632 - Earthquake.
 1647 - Social unrest.
 1656 - Plague.
 1683 - Flood.
 1690 - 1692 - Major plague in the Province of Bari resulting in the entire region being placed under quarantine. 
 1813 - City development outside the walls begins.
 1833 - August: Flood.
 1835 -  (state archives) established.
 1854 - Teatro Piccinni (theatre) opens.
 1860 - Bari becomes part of the Kingdom of Italy.
 1861 - Population: 44,572.
 1864 - Bari Centrale railway station opens.
 1868 - Bari–Taranto railway in operation.
 1872 - New Port of Bari development begins.
 1877 -  (library) opens.
 1887 - La Gazzetta del Mezzogiorno newspaper begins publication.
 1897 - Population: 80,450.
 1900 - Bari-Putignano railway begins operating.

20th century

 1901 -  (publisher) in business.
 1903 - Teatro Petruzzelli (theatre) opens.
 1905
 February: Flood.
 Bari-Casamassima-Putignano railway begins operating.
 1908 - F.C. Bari 1908 (football club) formed.
 1911 - Population: 103,670.
 1914 -  (theatre) opens.
 1915 - September: Flood.
 1921 - Population: 136,247.
 1924 - Università adriatica B. Mussolini founded.
 1925 - Conservatory of Bari established.
 1926 - November: Flood.
 1931 - Ferrovie del Sud Est (transit entity) established.
 1934 - Bari Airport built.
 1936
 Ferrotramviaria (transit entity) established.
 Population: 197,918.
 1943 - Air raid on Bari by German forces in World War II.
 1951 - Population: 268,183.
 1965 - Bari–Barletta railway begins operating.
 1981 - Population: 371,022.
 1985 - May:  held.
 1990
 Part of the 1990 FIFA World Cup football contest held in Bari.
 Polytechnic University of Bari established.
 Stadio San Nicola (stadium) opens.

21st century

 2008 - Bari metropolitan railway service begins operating.
 2009 - Bari International Film Festival begins.
 2013 - Population: 313,213.
 2014 - Antonio Decaro becomes mayor.
 2015
 May: Apulian regional election, 2015 held.
 Metropolitan City of Bari administration effected.
 2016 - 12 July: Andria–Corato train collision occurs in vicinity of Bari.

See also
 Bari history
 ; includes Timeline (in Italian)
 List of mayors of Bari
 List of bishops of Bari
 
  (region)

Other cities in the macroregion of South Italy:(it)
 Timeline of Brindisi, Apulia region
 Timeline of L'Aquila, Abruzzo region
 Timeline of Naples, Campania region
 Timeline of Reggio Calabria
 Timeline of Salerno, Campania
 Timeline of Taranto, Apulia

References

This article incorporates information from the Italian Wikipedia.

Bibliography

in English

in Italian
 
  1857-1858
 
 A. Beatillo. Storia di Bari. 1886
 
 F. Carabellese. Bari. Bergamo 1909
 F. Colavecchio. Guida di Bari. 1910
  1913-1915
 
 Vito Masellis. Storia di Bari dalle origini ai nostri giorni. Italstampa, 1966
 Dino Borri et al. Storia di Bari. Laterza, 1994
 Pietro Mazzeo. Storia di Bari dalle origini alla conquista normanna (1071), Adriatica Editrice, Bari, 2008

External links

 Items related to Bari, various dates (via Europeana)
 Items related to Bari, various dates (via Digital Public Library of America)

 
Bari